Guzów may refer to the following places in Poland:
Guzów, Lubusz Voivodeship (west Poland)
Guzów, Szydłowiec County in Masovian Voivodeship (east-central Poland)
Guzów, Żyrardów County in Masovian Voivodeship (east-central Poland)